NGC 97 is an elliptical galaxy estimated to be about 230 million light-years away in the constellation of Andromeda. It was discovered by John Herschel in 1828 and its apparent magnitude is 13.5.

References

External links
 

0097
Andromeda (constellation)
Astronomical objects discovered in 1828
Elliptical galaxies
Discoveries by John Herschel